Juno was a vehicle for hire operating in the United States. It is owned by Gett. It operates mobile apps on the Android and iOS operating systems.

Compared to its competitors, Juno took a smaller commission from every ride, as part of a strategy to attract and retain happier drivers. Juno initially had an equity structure that planned to give drivers fifty percent of the founder's equity by 2026, but this program was discontinued in 2017 when Juno was acquired by Gett.

History
Juno was founded by Talmon Marco, who served as the company's chief executive officer. The company headquarters is in New York City.

Information on Juno became public in February 2016, following an unheralded and unannounced beta testing of a software app to 2000 drivers in New York City. Information leaked, and the company began granting interviews by 16 February 2016.

Juno had intended to operate without press for several months.

Juno launched its ride sharing services in New York City in 2016.

Juno was acquired by Gett in 2017, for $200,000,000.

Juno ceased all transportation operations on 18 November 2019.

Juno sought an order to tap $1 million of a $4.5 million loan from its parent company to fund a bankruptcy liquidation on 20 November 2019.

In February 2020, Juno received court approval in Delaware for a Chapter 11 settlement with its unsecured creditors and parent company.

Product 
Juno is a bankrupt ride hailing app, making its own proprietary navigation software to do so. The company, which was primarily used in New York City, ceased operations in November of 2019, with customers told to use the app Lyft instead. Juno's parent company, Gett, is also a ride-sharing company, however, is primarily focused in Israel.

References

External links
 Juno website

Privately held companies of the United States
Ridesharing companies of the United States